Sergey Viktorovich Mushtruyev (born 28 February 1967) is a professional association football coach from Russia and a former Soviet player.

Honours
Soviet Cup winner: 1986
Soviet Cup finalist: 1989
Played 2 games in the 1986–87 European Cup Winners' Cup for FC Torpedo Moscow

External links

1967 births
Sportspeople from Ryazan
Living people
Soviet footballers
Association football defenders
Russian footballers
FC Torpedo Moscow players
Soviet Top League players
Russian football managers
FC Ryazan managers
FC Spartak Ryazan players